Arthur Kenealy Crosland (second ¼ 1880 – first ¼ 1929), also known by the nickname of "Nealy", was an English professional rugby league footballer who played in the 1900s, 1910s and 1920s. He played at representative level for Yorkshire, and at club level for Wakefield Trinity (Heritage No. 85) (captain), as a forward (prior to the specialist positions of), during the era of contested scrums.

Playing career

Wakefield Trinity career
Nealy Crosland played as a forward, i.e. number 9, in Wakefield Trinity's 0–6 defeat by Hull F.C. in the 1914 Challenge Cup Final during the 1913–14 season at Thrum Hall, Halifax, in front of a crowd of 19,000.

International honours
Nealy was selected for England in 1909 for the international against Wales, at Wakefield; but a week before the international, he suffered a serious injury at Hull KR (internal haemorrhaging) causing him to miss the next four months. He returned for the 1910 Tour Trial. Nealy Crosland was considered a "Probable" for the 1910 Great Britain Lions tour of Australia and New Zealand, but ultimately he was not selected for the tour.

Challenge Cup Final appearances
Nealy Crosland played as a forward, i.e. number 8, and scored a try in Wakefield Trinity's 17–0 victory over Hull F.C. in the 1909 Challenge Cup Final during the 1908–09 season at Headingley Rugby Stadium, Leeds on Tuesday 20 April 1909, in front of a crowd of 23,587.

County Cup Final appearances
Nealy Crosland played as a forward, i.e. number 9, in Wakefield Trinity's 8–2 victory over Huddersfield in the 1910 Yorkshire County Cup Final during the 1910–11 season at Headingley Rugby Stadium, Leeds on Saturday 3 December 1910.

Genealogical information
Nealy Crosland's marriage was registered during fourth ¼ 1907 in Wakefield district.

References

External links
Search for "Crosland" at rugbyleagueproject.org

1880 births
1929 deaths
English rugby league players
Rugby league players from Wakefield
Rugby league forwards
Wakefield Trinity captains
Wakefield Trinity players
Yorkshire rugby league team players